Sören Leopold Gustaf Danielsson (8 February 1930 – 19 April 2018) was a Swedish light-middleweight boxer (−71 kg). He competed at the 1952 Summer Olympics, but was eliminated in the second round.

References

1930 births
2018 deaths
Boxers at the 1952 Summer Olympics
Olympic boxers of Sweden
Swedish male boxers
Light-middleweight boxers
20th-century Swedish people